Everybody's Doing It is a 1938 American comedy film directed by Christy Cabanne using a screenplay by J. Robert Bren, Edmund Joseph, and Harry Segall, based on George Beck's story. RKO produced and distributed the film, releasing it on January 14, 1938.  The movie stars Preston Foster and Sally Eilers.

Plot
Bruce Keene works in the advertising department of Beyers and Company, which produces cereal, among other things. His heavy drinking conflicts with his work output. He and his fiancé, Penny Wilton, who also works in the advertising department, believe that a boost in the sales of Beyers' cereal can come about if Keene draws a series of pictograms to be printed on the cereal boxes over a 30-week period. Customers who solve all 30 pictograms will be eligible to compete for a $100,000 prize. Willy Beyers, the company president, agrees to the concept, and the contest is launched.

The contest is very successful, but Keene tires of creating a new pictogram in the waning weeks of the contest. He resumes his heavy drinking in bars. Wilton fears for her fiancé's future, hires a small-time hood, Softy Blane, to feign Keene's kidnaping so that while in the countryside he will finish the series of pictograms. Blane works for Steve Devers, a gangster who has taken an interest in manipulating the contest in order to win the $100,000. Blane doublecrosses Wilton, and really kidnaps Keene, taking him to Devers' hideout.

Keene works  in captivity to expose his kidnappers by drawing pictograms that tell of his situation that are sent to Beyers. Wilton understands the clues, and uses them to puzzle out where Keene is being held. She leads the police to the hideout, and after a shootout, Keene is rescued. Reunited with his fiancé, he promises to reform his drinking ways and marries Wilton.

Cast
 Preston Foster as Bruce Keene
 Sally Eilers as Penny Wilton
 Cecil Kellaway as Mr. Beyers
 Lorraine Krueger as Bubbles Blane
 William Brisbane as Willy Beyers
 Richard Lane as Steve Devers
 Guinn Williams as Softy Blane
 Arthur Lake as Waldo
 Solly Ward as Gus
 Frank M. Thomas as Charlie
 Herbert Evans as Grady
 Jack Carson as Lieutenant
 Fuzzy Knight as Gangster
 Willie Best as Jasper)

(Cast list as per AFI film database)

Production
In June 1937 it was announced that B. P. Schulberg and Vivienne Osborne had been cast in the picture. By the middle of November 1937 the film, still known by its working title, Easy Millions, had finished production and was in the editing room. A November Variety article listed Christy Cabanne as the director, as well as William Sistrom as the producer. The screenplay was by J. Robert Bren, Edmund Joseph, and Harry Segall, while the cinematographer was announced as Paul Vogel. The cast list was described as Preston Foster, Sally Eilers, Paul Guilfoyle, Cecil Kellaway, and Lorraine Krueger. In early December the title of the film was changed to Everybody's Doing It, from its working title of Easy Millions. In mid-December, it was announced that the picture was to be released on January 14, 1938, and RKO did release the film on that date. The National Legion of Decency approved the picture for all audiences, rating it class A-1.

Reception
Harrison's Reports gave the film a mediocre review, stating that the plot was "so thin that, in order to pad it out to a full length feature, the producer had to use up some of the footage in the most stupid type of slapstick imaginable". Motion Picture Daily'''s opinion was quite lukewarm, saying that the film was an "inexpensive fabrication that may be unusual enough to satisfy the moderate taste moderately." The Motion Picture Herald'' gave a very ambiguous review, wherein they neither praised nor spoke negatively about the film, instead speaking about the film's structure and relation to recent films written along similar lines. They also linked the plot of the film to a recently past advertising scheme, called "Gold Coast", which bore a striking resemblance to the advertising gambit portrayed in the film. Finally, the magazine did comment that the audience's reaction at the showing they viewed was "spotty".

References

External links

1938 comedy films
1938 films
American comedy films
Films directed by Christy Cabanne
RKO Pictures films
American black-and-white films
1930s American films